Lepidophyma tarascae, the Tarascan tropical night lizard, is a species of lizard in the family Xantusiidae. It is a small lizard found in Mexico. It is currently known from two widely-separated locations in the State of Michoacán – near Playa Mexiquillo on the Pacific coast, and inland to the north in the Sierra de Coalcomán, a northwestern sub-range of the Sierra Madre del Sur. It inhabits forests and rocky areas.

References

Lepidophyma
Endemic reptiles of Mexico
Jalisco dry forests
Fauna of the Sierra Madre del Sur
Reptiles described in 1982
Taxa named by Robert L. Bezy
Taxa named by Robert G. Webb